Bongwon-dong is a legal dong, neighbourhood of the Seodaemun-gu district in Seoul, South Korea and is governed by its administrative dong, Sinchon-dong's office.
Bongwon-dong has the Bongwon-Temple(Bongwonsa) built by Great master Doseon (827–898) in 889, 3rd year of Jinseong Queen, the 51st of Shilla Dynasty.
Bongwon-Temple gives opportunities for visitors to experience "Seoul Lotus Festival" and "Yeongsamjae ritual" annually.

See also 
 Administrative divisions of South Korea

References

External links 
 Seodaemun-gu Official site in English
 Map of Seodaemun-gu
  Seodaemun-gu Official website

Neighbourhoods of Seodaemun District